Monterey Bandstand, also known as Kleckner Park Bandstand, is a historic bandstand located at Monterey, Pulaski County, Indiana. It was built in 1912, and is a wood-frame structure measuring 12 feet, 6 inches, wide, and 20 feet long.  It is raised on 30 inch high piers.  The building has a hipped roof and exhibits Queen Anne style design elements.  The bandstand was restored in 1979.

It was listed on the National Register of Historic Places in 2012.

The grandstand has deteriorated during the last several years due to flooding, weather and some vandalism. It has been sold to a private owner and will soon no longer be the property of the town of Monterey. The structure must be removed by the owner by Feb. 24, 2017.

References

Event venues on the National Register of Historic Places in Indiana
Queen Anne architecture in Indiana
Buildings and structures completed in 1912
Buildings and structures in Pulaski County, Indiana
National Register of Historic Places in Pulaski County, Indiana